Number Nine: Or, The Mindsweepers is a 1951 comedy novel by the British writer A.P. Herbert. It was written as a parody of the Civil Service selection board and portrays several recruits attending a course at an assessment centre. They gather at the ancestral home of an aristocratic admiral, much to his dismay.

References

Bibliography
 Raban, Sandra. Examining the World: A History of the University of Cambridge Local Examinations Syndicate. Cambridge University Press,  2008.

1951 British novels
British comedy novels
Novels by A. P. Herbert
Methuen Publishing books